The list of ship decommissionings in 2002 includes a chronological list of all ships decommissioned in 2002.


See also 

2002
 Ship decommissionings
Ship